Events in the year 2017 in Algeria.

Incumbents
 President: Abdelaziz Bouteflika
 Prime Minister: 
 until 25 May: Abdelmalek Sellal
 25 May-15 August: Abdelmadjid Tebboune
 starting 16 August: Ahmed Ouyahia

Events
4 May – scheduled date for the Algerian legislative election, 2017

Deaths

26 January – Bakhti Belaïb, politician (b. 1953).
6/7 February – Smail Hamdani, politician, former Prime Minister of Algeria (b. 1930).
11 February – Danièle Djamila Amrane-Minne, political activist, academic and writer (b. 1939).

References

 
2010s in Algeria
Years of the 21st century in Algeria
Algeria
Algeria